There was a nominal total of 96 quota places available (in parasport events only) for swimming at the 2022 Commonwealth Games; 48 each for men and women.

Rules
Each Commonwealth Games Association (CGA) may qualify up to three places per event, which equates to a maximum quota of thirty-six. Seven places per event are determined by the World Para Swimming (WPS) World Rankings (for performances between 31 December 2020 and 18 April 2022), with the last spot reserved for a Bipartite Invitation; all those who qualify may also enter other events provided the three-per-CGA limit is respected.

The events are open to sport classes as follows:
Men's 50 m freestyle S7: S6/7
Men's 50 m freestyle S13: S11–13
Men's 200 m freestyle S14: S14
Men's 100 m backstroke S9: S8/9
Men's 100 m breaststroke SB8: SB7/8
Men's 100 m butterfly S10: S9/10
Women's 50 m freestyle S13: S11–13
Women's 100 m freestyle S9: S8/9
Women's 200 m freestyle S14: S14
Women's 100 m backstroke S8: S7/8
Women's 100 m breaststroke SB6: SB5/6
Women's 200 m individual medley SM10: SM9/10

Timeline

Men's events

50 m freestyle S7

50 m freestyle S13

200 m freestyle S14

100 m backstroke S9

100 m breaststroke SB8

100 m butterfly S10

Women's events

50 m freestyle S13

100 m freestyle S9

200 m freestyle S14

100 m backstroke S8

100 m breaststroke SB6

200 m individual medley SM10

References

2020 in swimming
2021 in swimming
2022 in swimming
Swimming at the 2022 Commonwealth Games
Qualification for the 2022 Commonwealth Games